Penpethy is a hamlet in the parish of Tintagel, Cornwall, England. Penpethy is south of Condolden and east of Trebarwith Strand.

References

Hamlets in Cornwall